Sardar Panchhi (original name: Karnail Singh, born 14 October 1932) is a Punjabi, Urdu and Hindi poet. Sardar Panchhi is his pen name. He has written several songs for Bollywood movies. Notable of them are "Ek Chadar Maili Si" and "Waris."

Life 
He was born (14 October 1932) and brought up at a village near Gujranwala, British Punjab (now in Pakistan). He was 17 when India got partitioned and he and his family had to migrate to India.

Books 
Sardar Panchhi has written seven books in Punjabi, nine in Urdu and two in Hindi.
 Mazdoor Ki Avaz
 Sanvley Suraj
 Suraj Ke Sakhe (Publisher:Chetna Prakashan)
 Adhoore But
 Dard Ka Tarjuma
 Turkre Turkre Ayana(Publisher:Chetna Prakashan)
 Vanjhli de Sur
 Shivranjni
 NAKASH-E-KADAM
 MERI NAZAR MEN AAP
 UJALON KE HAMSAFAR
 GULISTAN-E-AQIDAT
 BOSTAN-E-AQIDAT
 PANCHHI DEE PARVAZ
 KADAM KADAM TANHAI(Publisher:Chetna Prakashan)

References 

Urdu-language poets
Punjabi-language poets
1932 births
Living people
People from Gujranwala District